Sergiu Zacon (born 13 November 1987) is a Moldavian football striker who plays for FC Nistru Otaci.

Club statistics
Total matches played in Moldavian First League: 109 matches - 11 goals

References

External links

Profile at Divizia Nationala
Profile at UEFA

1987 births
People from Leova District
Moldovan footballers
Living people
FC Tighina players
Association football midfielders